Bagnall Beach Observatory (obs. code: 433) is a privately owned astronomical observatory by Greg Crawford, located in Corlette, New South Wales, on the east coast of Australia. The observatory has discovered 3 minor planets:

See also
 List of astronomical observatories

References

Astronomical observatories in New South Wales